Eurydochus is a genus of flowering plants in the family Asteraceae.

There is only one known species, Eurydochus bracteatus, native to Amazonas State in southern Venezuela and to its adjacent namesake, Amazonas State in northern Brazil.

formerly included
now in Gongylolepis 
Eurydochus cortesii S.Díaz, synonym of Gongylolepis cortesii (S.Díaz) Pruski & S.Díaz

References

Monotypic Asteraceae genera
Flora of the Amazon
Stifftioideae